François Bachy (born 6 March 1960) is a French television journalist. Born in Saint-Cloud, Hauts-de-Seine, he entered the Training Center for Journalists (CFJ) after obtaining a law degree and a master's degree in political science.

Career
He had a career on TF1, where he started as a journalist in the economic department (1984–1985) before transferring to service policy (1985–1989). He presented the 11 p.m. weekend news from 1989 until 1991 and '7 arts à la une (1989–1993). He also worked as the Grand Reporter for Culture (1991–1993).

Bachy remains a political journalist: he worked as Deputy head (1994–1996) and Chief of the policy department, before becoming Deputy editor (1996–2002) and Chief editor in the economic and political departments (2002 onwards).

During the presidential campaign of 2002, he hosted a "campaign news" in Jean-Pierre Pernaut's news broadcasts at 1pm.

He was awarded Knight of the National Order of Merit by Jacques Chirac on 3 May 2007.

He is Deputy Director of Public Information, in charge of the political center since 2008.

In 2008, he hosted Le Blog Politique on TF1 and LCI.

He is the author of two books about François Hollande.

Bibliography
 François Hollande, un destin tranquille, Plon, 2001
 L'énigme François Hollande, Plon, 2005

References

1960 births
Living people
People from Saint-Cloud
French television journalists
Knights of the Ordre national du Mérite
French LGBT journalists